Zach's Ceremony is an Australian coming of age documentary film. It looks at the transition to adulthood from an indigenous cultural perspective. It features Zach Doomadgee and his father Alec Doomadgee.

About the film
The film looks at what it means to be an indigenous Australian and Zach Doomadgee's cultural journey. Zach who is of indigenous and Caucasian descent is influenced by two cultures. It also looks at how Zach is affected by being one of the few Indigenous children at his Sydney school, being too dark. It also looks at his being too light-skinned when he visits his father's community in far-north Queensland.

Alec Doomadgee played a major part in the film in both direction and production. 
The film was shown at New York's Margaret Mead Film Festival.

The film was begin in 2009 when Zach was aged around 10.

Theater screenings
It was announced by FilmInk that the documentary would open across Australia from Thursday 30 March, 2016, and screen at Cinema Nova in Carlton, Victoria.

Awards
At the Byron Bay Film Festival, Zach's Ceremony along with Brendan Shoebridge's film, The Bentley Effect took the top awards. Alec Doomadgee was also winner of the Festival’s Best Documentary Award. It also won Best documentary awards at both the Melbourne International Film Festival and the Sydney Film Festival.

References

External links
 Imdb
 Website

Documentary films about Aboriginal Australians
2016 documentary films
2010s English-language films